Pokémon: Symphonic Evolutions was a series of official musical concerts presented by The Pokémon Company and produced by Princeton Entertainment, featuring the music of the Pokémon series.

Music
Pokémon: Symphonic Evolutions presents orchestrated music from Pokémon games over the years and other popular songs from the franchise's history, such as the "Pokémon Theme". The name "Symphonic Evolutions" refers not only to the concert program but also to the constant change in the Pokémon series, such as: Pokémon Red and Pokémon Blue, Pokémon Yellow, Pokémon Gold and Pokémon Silver, Pokémon Crystal, Pokémon Ruby and Pokémon Sapphire, Pokémon Emerald, Pokémon Diamond and Pokémon Pearl, Pokémon Platinum, Pokémon Black and Pokémon White, and Pokémon X and Pokémon Y. The concert also highlighted music from the Pokémon anime series and films. The final world performance of the show was at DeVos Performance Hall in Grand Rapids, Michigan, on January 6, 2018. 

Concerts have been conducted by Susie Seiter and orchestrated by her husband, Chad Seiter and his co-worker Jeron Moore.

History

Schedule

Cancelled shows

Notes

Setlist
Introduction
 Overture
 Pallet Town (from Red, Blue, and Yellow)
 Prepare for Trouble (from Red, Blue, and Yellow)
 Born to be a Champion (from Red, Blue, and Yellow)
 Ecruteak City (from Gold, Silver, and Crystal)
 Songs of the Towers (from Gold, Silver, and Crystal)
 ... (from Gold, Silver, and Crystal)
 Ancients of Hoenn (from Ruby, Sapphire, and Emerald)
 Falling Ashes (from Ruby, Sapphire, and Emerald)
 End of the Road (from Ruby, Sapphire, and Emerald)
 Dreams and Adventures (from Diamond, Pearl, and Platinum)
 Routes of Sinnoh (from Diamond, Pearl, and Platinum)
 The Lake Guardians (from Diamond, Pearl, and Platinum)

Intermission

 Pokémon Center
 The Day I Became King (from Black and White)
 N-Counter (from Black and White)
 Farewell (from Black and White)
 An Eternal Prison (from X and Y)
 Welcome to Kalos (from X and Y)
 Professor Sycamore (from X and Y)
 Friends, Fights & Finales (from X and Y)

Encore

 Gotta Catch 'em All (Pokémon Theme)
 KISEKI

Tour Merchandise 
The official merchandise of Pokémon: Symphonic Evolutions includes two posters and an official T-shirt. The T-shirts are black in colour and feature the official maestro Pikachu artwork from promotional materials for the concerts. One poster is white and features the maestro Pikachu artwork. The other is black and features the official artwork of Pikachu with Bulbasaur, Charmander and Squirtle.

The T-shirts each cost $35 in Canada, $30 in Australia, and £25 in the UK. The two posters each cost $25 in Canada, $20 in Australia, and £15 in the UK. In Canada, they could be purchased as a pair for $35.

Reception

References 

2014 concert tours
2015 concert tours
2016 concert tours
2017 concert tours
Symphonic Evolutions
Video game concert tours
Nintendo music